Jerusalem Avenue is one of the principal streets of the capital city of Warsaw in Poland. It runs through the City Centre along the East-West axis, linking the western borough of Wola with the bridge on the Vistula River and the borough of Praga on the other side of the river.

History
The name of the street comes from a small village erected in 1774 by prince and marshal August Sułkowski for the Jewish settlers in Mazovia. The name of the village was Nowa Jerozolima (New Jerusalem), and the road to Warsaw was named Aleja Jerozolimska (singular, as opposed to the modern Polish name, which is plural). Although the village was abandoned shortly after its foundation, and most of the Jews eventually moved to the city itself, the name stuck and has been used ever since. 

It was there that the first railway station in Warsaw was built. In the late 19th century, the easternmost part of it became one of the most representative—and the most expensive—areas of the ever-growing city. In the early 20th century, and especially after Poland regained its independence in 1918, the street was extended westwards, and the borough of Wola was eventually incorporated into the city. 

Most of the houses along the avenue, including priceless examples of art nouveau and modernist architecture, were destroyed during the systematic destruction of the city by Nazi German forces in the aftermath of the Warsaw Uprising. 

After World War II, the Stalinist regime demolished what was left of the buildings, and since then the northern side of the street is currently dominated by the gigantic Palace of Culture and Science and the Warszawa Centralna railway station. The only surviving blocks of pre-war architecture are located to the south of the street, including the historic Hotel Polonia Palace and the Hoserów townhouse apartment building at 51 Jerusalem which host the Warsaw Fotoplastikon vintage stereoscopic theatre in its courtyard. Halfway down the street, at the junction with Krucza and Bracka streets, Warsaw's original main post-war department store, CDT 'Smyk' is located.

Images

References

Streets in Warsaw
Śródmieście, Warsaw